Conference USA first sponsored football in 1996. This is a list of its annual standings since establishment.

Standings

References

Conference USA
Standings